Erich Fischer (born March 12, 1966) is an American water polo player. He competed in the men's tournament at the 1992 Summer Olympics.

References

External links
 

1966 births
Living people
American male water polo players
Olympic water polo players of the United States
Water polo players at the 1992 Summer Olympics
People from Dinuba, California